JCC may refer to:

People
John C. Calhoun (1782–1850), American vice president under John Quincy Adams and Andrew Jackson
John Cooper Clarke (born 1949), English performance poet
Jimmy Chamberlin Complex, a Jazz-Fusion band formed by former Smashing Pumpkins drummer Jimmy Chamberlin
Julio César Chávez (born 1962), Mexican boxer
Julio César Chávez Jr. (born 1986), son of the 1962 born Mexican boxer
John Calvin Coolidge, Jr., the 30th president of the United States

Places
Jakarta Convention Center
Jamestown Community College
Jefferson Community College (disambiguation), various places
Jewish Community Centre for London
Jhenidah Cadet College
John C. Campbell Folk School
John Charles Centre for Sport, Leeds, England
Johnston Community College, Smithfield, North Carolina 
Jackson College, formerly known as Jackson Community College
JCC (Jaeneung Culture Center), Seoul, South Korea
China Basin Heliport, IATA code JCC, dismantled when the SFPD Aero Division was disbanded

Organisations 
 Jewish Community Center
 Jewish Claims Conference, formally The Conference on Jewish Material Claims Against Germany
 JC International Airlines (ICAO code: JCC)

Programming 
 Java Call Control, in reference to Java Programming
 Jcc, standard notation for any x86 conditional jump
 JCC Driver, a JDBC driver for IBM's DB2 Universal Database

Things
al Jazeera Children's Channel
Jane Coffin Childs Memorial Fund for Medical Research
Japanese Crude Cocktail, basket of crude oils used as a basis for gas-pricing
Jedi Council Community
Job Corps Center
Joint Control Commission
Journal of Computational Chemistry, an academic journal
Journal of Corporate Citizenship, an academic journal published by Greenleaf Publishing
 , the local Tunisian name (in French) for the Carthage Film Festival of Tunis   
Jubilee Comedy Circus, a comedy show that aired on Sony TV
Joseph Chamberlain College, College in Birmingham, England
Joint Crisis Committee, a type of committee in Model UN
Junior Car Club, an early name for the British Automobile Racing Club

See also
 JJCC, a South Korean hip-hop boy group
 JJC (disambiguation)
 JC (disambiguation)